Chazuke (茶漬け, ちゃづけ) or ochazuke (お茶漬け, from (o)cha 'tea' + tsuke 'submerge') is a simple Japanese dish made by pouring green tea, dashi, or hot water over cooked rice. Chazuke provides a good way to use leftover rice as a quick snack because this dish is easy to make.  In Kyoto, ochazuke is known as bubuzuke. Since the 1970s, packaged "instant ochazuke", consisting of freeze-dried toppings and seasonings, has become popular.

Common toppings include tsukemono (Japanese pickles), umeboshi, nori (seaweed), furikake, sesame seeds, tarako and mentaiko (salted and marinated pollock roe), salted salmon, shiokara (pickled seafood), scallions, and wasabi.

History 

This dish first became popular in the Heian period of Japan, when water was most commonly poured over rice, but beginning in the Edo period, tea was often used instead.

It is said that the direct ancestor of today's chazuke is a method of eating that was adopted by servants (apprentices) who were employed by merchants at that time so that they could finish their meal very quickly during their work. At that time, the servants spent most of their day working, and their meal times were controlled by their superiors, so this form of eating naturally arose. Pickles were almost the only side dish (side dish) that the apprentices were allowed to eat freely in the simple meals of the apprentices, and they were often piled up in huge bowls . It is speculated that this was also closely related to the establishment of the food form of chazuke. Since there was still no technology to keep cooked rice warm as it is today, chazuke was a convenient way to enjoy cold rice and to finish a meal quickly, just like yuzuke. It was very useful and popular.

Instant Chazuke 
Nagatanien proposed the concept of "brewed tea rice" in 1952 and launched " Chazuo Seaweed.This product is asmall package containing matcha.

See also 
 Lei cha

References

Japanese cuisine
Japanese rice dishes
Tea dishes